Kim Taylor Bennett is a British-American journalist television presenter based in London, UK. After working on thelondonpaper and serving as a staff writer for Time Out, she now serves as the style editor for Noisey, the music channel of VICE Magazine. She also contributes to Nylon, The Fader and GQ.

Presenting

Bennett is the presenter of From The Red Carpet, a short fortnightly entertainment show screened in Odeon and Picturehouse cinemas.

She has also presented shows for VBS, MTV and The Brits, as well as appearing as a talking head for BBC3, Channel 4, MTV and E4.

References

External links
 
 
 BBC Collective page

British television presenters
Living people
Writers from San Francisco
1983 births